Organization of Behavior is a 1949 book by the psychologist Donald O. Hebb.

Reception
The author Richard Webster identifies Organization of Behavior as the most influential outline of Hebb's postulate. According to Webster, the hypothesis has classic status within science and is supported by recent research.

References

Bibliography
Books

 

1949 non-fiction books
Books by Donald O. Hebb
English-language books
Neuroscience books